Slate Ridge School is a historic school located at Whiteford, Harford County, Maryland. The main block of the building is two stories, constructed of brick with a slate hip roof and a small wooden cupola in the center. It was built in 1912, and designed by the Baltimore architect Otto Simonson. A narrow hyphen containing a stairwell and corridor connects the main block to a similar two-story rectangular block and a one-story wing containing a stage and gymnasium, added just after World War II.  It was used until about 1980.

It was listed on the National Register of Historic Places in 1987.

References

External links
, including photo from 1986, at Maryland Historical Trust

Defunct schools in Maryland
Buildings and structures in Harford County, Maryland
School buildings on the National Register of Historic Places in Maryland
School buildings completed in 1912
1912 establishments in Maryland
National Register of Historic Places in Harford County, Maryland